Jonas James Pate (born January 15, 1970) is an American screenwriter, director and producer. He wrote and directed The Grave, Deceiver, The Take, and directed Shrink. Pate also co-created Good vs Evil, Surface and Outer Banks.

Early life
Jonas Pate was born in Winston-Salem, North Carolina, and is the twin brother of fellow filmmaker Josh Pate. Pate's parents divorced when he was young, and the siblings were raised through elementary school with their mother and step-father in Atlanta, Georgia, and through high school with their father and step-mother in Raeford, NC. He studied philosophy at Princeton University, and graduated in 1992.

Career
In 1996, Pate started his career by writing and directing the thriller film called The Grave with his brother Josh. After a screening at the Sundance Film Festival, it received a wide range of positive reviews. The following year, they collaborated on the movie Deceiver. He subsequently co-created the fantasy action television show Good vs Evil (1999) alongside his brother. From 2003 to 2004, he served as co-executive producer on L.A. Dragnet, for which he also wrote an episode. In 2005, he co-created the science fiction series Surface, which aired until 2006.

As his filmography was already fleshing out, he took on several directing jobs on television series like Battlestar Galactica (2005), Bionic Woman (2007), Friday Night Lights (2007-2010), Chuck (2008), The Philanthropist (2009), Caprica (2010), Undercovers (2010), The Event (2010-2011), and Prime Suspect (2011). He continued his film career by writing the screenplay for The Take (2007). In 2009, he directed the independent film Shrink.

Pate is the director and executive producer on the Battlestar Galactica prequel entitled Blood & Chrome. He has also signed on to direct the independent crime drama film Way Down South, written by himself and his brother.

Pate is the creator and executive producer of Outer Banks for Netflix, a drama that premiered on April 15, 2020.

Personal life
Pate currently lives with his wife, Jennifer, and two children in Wilmington, North Carolina.

In 2020, he was appointed by Governor Roy Cooper to the Governor’s Advisory Council on Film, Television, and Digital Streaming.

Filmography

Awards and nominations

References

External links

 

1970 births
Living people
20th-century American screenwriters
21st-century American screenwriters
21st-century American male writers
American television directors
American male screenwriters
Princeton University alumni
People from Raeford, North Carolina
Film directors from North Carolina
Showrunners